Harold "Harry" Meachum is a fictional character appearing in American comic books published by Marvel Comics. The character is depicted as a sinister businessman, primarily a foe of Iron Fist. In his original appearances in comics, he is depicted as the father of Joy Meachum and the brother of Ward Meachum.

In the first season of the Marvel Cinematic Universe series Iron Fist, Harold was the father of both Joy and Ward and was portrayed by David Wenham.

Publication history

Harold Meachum first appeared in Marvel Premiere #15 and was created by Roy Thomas and Gil Kane.

Fictional character biography
Harold Meachum was the business partner of Wendell Rand, father of Daniel (who would later become Iron Fist). When traveling with his business partner and his young family to uncover what would be a major discovery in business, they came across K'un-L'un, a stronghold of a colony of humanoid aliens whose spaceship crashed in a pocket dimension that intersects with Earth.

After having left Wendell Rand, Harold began to trek back to civilization and got lost in the Himalayas. Due to the dangerous weather even upon being found by a woman and some sherpas, Harold had to have his legs amputated. Upon being told about what happened to his legs, Harold had to remain at the hut until a cart can be afforded to carry him to the airport. During this time, Harold had heard a monk talking about the K'un-L'un and about a boy who was taken in by its inhabitants upon his parents ending up dead. Knowing that the boy is Danny, Harold knew that his training would excel and that he would come to take revenge on him when the portal to K'un-L'un opens in the next 10 years. Paranoid at this, he spent the next ten years setting up death traps and hiring assassins to stop Danny Rand. He also hired Triple-Iron to be his chief assassin who kept Harold in a chamber that he will emerge from when Danny Rand is killed. On the tenth year, Harold instated a $10,000 contract to whoever can bring the wearer of the Iron Fist dragon band to him dead or alive.

When Iron Fist defeated a gang of four men wanting to take in on the bounty offered by Harold Meachum, he also defeated Scythe who surrendered Harold's location.

Iron Fist made his way to Meachum Industries where he fought his way past every death trap and had a fight with Triple-Iron.

When Iron Fist confronted Harold Meachum upon defeating Triple-Iron, he took pity on Meachum's current state and spared his life. However, a ninja working for Master Khan ended up assassinating Meachum anyway after throwing a shuriken at the gun that Meachum was going to use on Iron Fist. His daughter Joy assumed Iron Fist had killed him and his brother Ward Meachum started planning his revenge on Iron Fist.

In other media
David Wenham portrays Harold Meachum in season 1 of Iron Fist. This version is depicted as a business partner of Wendell Rand, and while Joy is still his daughter, Ward is now depicted as his son. Harold helped Danny's parents to run Rand Enterprises. In 2004, he died of cancer, but was revived to serve The Hand while they use Rand Enterprises for their own goals. Harold is under strict control of the Hand, and Joy does not know that he is alive. Only Ward and an assistant know of his existence and he continues to run Rand Enterprises in private using Ward as a proxy. When he learns of Danny's return, as well as what Danny had become, he asks for Danny's help in releasing the Hand's control over him and gives Danny control of Rand Enterprises so he can identify the Hand's operatives in the company. He subsequently dies again at the hands of Ward, and undergoes another resurrection. Joy learns he is alive, but the repeated resurrections makes him emotionally unstable and dangerous. After Danny drives the Hand out of Rand Enterprises, Harold frames Danny for the narcotics distribution the Hand was operating through the company, revealing Harold's ultimate goal of taking control of the company for himself. Danny learns that Harold was behind the death of his parents, which during a showdown leads Harold to be impaled on a piece of rebar and shot twice, before falling from the roof of the company's corporate tower to his death. Danny and Ward have his body cremated.

References

External links
 Harold Meachum at Marvel Wiki
 

Characters created by Gil Kane
Characters created by Roy Thomas
Comics characters introduced in 1974
Fictional businesspeople
Iron Fist (comics)
Marvel Comics characters
Marvel Comics supervillains